Vangelis Alexopoulos (born 16 August 1995) is a Greek professional footballer who plays as a striker for Super League 2 club Panachaiki.

References

1995 births
Living people
Greek footballers
Football League (Greece) players
Kalamata F.C. players
Association football forwards
Footballers from Kalamata